Gravitoelectromagnetism, abbreviated GEM, refers to a set of formal analogies between the equations for electromagnetism and relativistic gravitation; specifically: between Maxwell's field equations and an approximation, valid under certain conditions, to the Einstein field equations for general relativity. Gravitomagnetism is a widely used term referring specifically to the kinetic effects of gravity, in analogy to the magnetic effects of moving electric charge. The most common version of GEM is valid only far from isolated sources, and for slowly moving test particles.

The analogy and equations differing only by some small factors were first published in 1893, before general relativity, by Oliver Heaviside as a separate theory expanding Newton's law.

Background
This approximate reformulation of gravitation as described by general relativity in the weak field limit makes an apparent field appear in a frame of reference different from that of a freely moving inertial body. This apparent field may be described by two components that act respectively like the electric and magnetic fields of electromagnetism, and by analogy these are called the gravitoelectric and  gravitomagnetic fields, since these arise in the same way around a mass that a moving electric charge is the source of electric and magnetic fields. The main consequence of the gravitomagnetic field, or velocity-dependent acceleration, is that a moving object near a massive, non-axisymmetric, rotating object will experience acceleration not predicted by a purely Newtonian (gravitoelectric) gravity field. More subtle predictions, such as induced rotation of a falling object and precession of a spinning object are among the last basic predictions of general relativity to be directly tested.

Indirect validations of gravitomagnetic effects have been derived from analyses of relativistic jets. Roger Penrose had proposed a mechanism that relies on frame-dragging-related effects for extracting energy and momentum from rotating black holes. Reva Kay Williams, University of Florida, developed a rigorous proof that validated Penrose's mechanism. Her model showed how the Lense–Thirring effect could account for the observed high energies and luminosities of quasars and active galactic nuclei; the collimated jets about their polar axis; and the asymmetrical jets (relative to the orbital plane). All of those observed properties could be explained in terms of gravitomagnetic effects. Williams' application of Penrose's mechanism can be applied to black holes of any size. Relativistic jets can serve as the largest and brightest form of validations for gravitomagnetism.

A group at Stanford University is currently analyzing data from the first direct test of GEM, the Gravity Probe B satellite experiment, to see whether they are consistent with gravitomagnetism. The Apache Point Observatory Lunar Laser-ranging Operation also plans to observe gravitomagnetism effects.

Equations

According to general relativity, the gravitational field produced by a rotating object (or any rotating mass–energy) can, in a particular limiting case, be described by equations that have the same form as in classical electromagnetism. Starting from the basic equation of general relativity, the Einstein field equation, and assuming a weak gravitational field or reasonably flat spacetime, the gravitational analogs to Maxwell's equations for electromagnetism, called the "GEM equations", can be derived. GEM equations compared to Maxwell's equations are:

where:
 Eg is the gravitoelectric field (conventional gravitational field), with SI unit m⋅s−2
 E is the electric field
 Bg is the gravitomagnetic field, with SI unit s−1
 B is the magnetic field
 ρg is mass density with, SI unit kg⋅m−3
 ρ is charge density
 Jg is mass current density or mass flux (Jg = ρgvρ, where vρ is the velocity of the mass flow), with SI unit kg⋅m−2⋅s−1
 J is electric current density
 G is the gravitational constant
 ε0 is the vacuum permittivity
 c is both the speed of propagation of gravity and the speed of light.

Lorentz force
For a test particle whose mass m is "small", in a stationary system, the net (Lorentz) force acting on it due to a GEM field is described by the following GEM analog to the Lorentz force equation:

where:
 v is the velocity of the test particle
 m is the mass of the test particle
 q is the electric charge of the test particle.

Poynting vector
The GEM Poynting vector compared to the electromagnetic Poynting vector is given by:

Scaling of fields

The literature does not adopt a consistent scaling for the gravitoelectric and gravitomagnetic fields, making comparison tricky.  For example, to obtain agreement with Mashhoon's writings, all instances of Bg in the GEM equations must be multiplied by − and Eg by −1.  These factors variously modify the analogues of the equations for the Lorentz force.  There is no scaling choice that allows all the GEM and EM equations to be perfectly analogous.  The discrepancy in the factors arises because the source of the gravitational field is the second order stress–energy tensor, as opposed to the source of the electromagnetic field being the first order four-current tensor.  This difference becomes clearer when one compares non-invariance of relativistic mass to electric charge invariance. This can be traced back to the spin-2 character of the gravitational field, in contrast to the electromagnetism being a spin-1 field. (See Relativistic wave equations for more on "spin-1" and "spin-2" fields).

Higher-order effects
Some higher-order gravitomagnetic effects can reproduce effects reminiscent of the interactions of more conventional polarized charges. For instance, if two wheels are spun on a common axis, the mutual gravitational attraction between the two wheels will be greater if they spin in opposite directions than in the same direction. This can be expressed as an attractive or repulsive gravitomagnetic component.

Gravitomagnetic arguments also predict that a flexible or fluid toroidal mass undergoing minor axis rotational acceleration (accelerating "smoke ring" rotation) will tend to pull matter through the throat (a case of rotational frame dragging, acting through the throat). In theory, this configuration might be used for accelerating objects (through the throat) without such objects experiencing any g-forces.

Consider a toroidal mass with two degrees of rotation (both major axis and minor-axis spin, both turning inside out and revolving). This represents a "special case" in which gravitomagnetic effects generate a chiral corkscrew-like gravitational field around the object. The reaction forces to dragging at the inner and outer equators would normally be expected to be equal and opposite in magnitude and direction respectively in the simpler case involving only minor-axis spin. When both rotations are applied simultaneously, these two sets of reaction forces can be said to occur at different depths in a radial Coriolis field that extends across the rotating torus, making it more difficult to establish that cancellation is complete.

Modelling this complex behaviour as a curved spacetime problem has yet to be done and is believed to be very difficult.

Gravitomagnetic fields of astronomical objects

The formula for the gravitomagnetic field Bg near a rotating body can be derived from the GEM equations. It is exactly half of the Lense–Thirring precession rate, and is given by:

where L is the angular momentum of the body. At the equatorial plane, r and L are perpendicular, so their dot product vanishes, and this formula reduces to:

The magnitude of angular momentum of a homogeneous ball-shaped body is:

where:
 is the moment of inertia of a ball-shaped body (see: list of moments of inertia);
 is the angular velocity;
m is the mass;
r is the radius;
T is the rotational period.

Gravitational waves have equal gravitomagnetic and gravitoelectric components.

Earth
Therefore, the magnitude of Earth's gravitomagnetic field at its equator is:

where  is Earth's gravity. The field direction coincides with the angular moment direction, i.e. north.

Such a field is extremely weak and requires extremely sensitive measurements to be detected. One experiment to measure such field was the Gravity Probe B mission.

Pulsar
If the preceding formula is used with the pulsar PSR J1748-2446ad (which rotates 716 times per second), assuming a radius of 16 km, and two solar masses, then

equals about 166 Hz. This would be easy to notice. However, the pulsar is spinning at a quarter of the speed of light at the equator, and its radius is only three times more than its Schwarzschild radius. When such fast motion and such strong gravitational fields exist in a system, the simplified approach of separating gravitomagnetic and gravitoelectric forces can be applied only as a very rough approximation.

Lack of invariance 

While Maxwell's equations are invariant under Lorentz transformations, the GEM equations are not.  The fact that ρg and jg do not form a four-vector (instead they are merely a part of the stress–energy tensor) is the basis of this difference.

Although GEM may hold approximately in two different reference frames connected by a Lorentz boost, there is no way to calculate the GEM variables of one such frame from the GEM variables of the other, unlike the situation with the variables of electromagnetism. Indeed, their predictions (about what motion is free fall) will probably conflict with each other.

Note that the GEM equations are invariant under translations and spatial rotations, just not under boosts and more general curvilinear transformations. Maxwell's equations can be formulated in a way that makes them invariant under all of these coordinate transformations.

See also

 Anti-gravity
 Artificial gravity
 Frame-dragging
 Geodetic effect
 Gravitational radiation
 Gravity Probe B
 Kaluza–Klein theory
 Linearized gravity
 Speed of gravity § Electrodynamical analogies
 Stationary spacetime
Non-Relativistic Gravitational Fields

References

Further reading

Books

Papers

 in

External links
 Gravity Probe B: Testing Einstein's Universe
 Gyroscopic Superconducting Gravitomagnetic Effects news on tentative result of European Space Agency (esa) research
 In Search of Gravitomagnetism, NASA, 20 April 2004.
 Gravitomagnetic London Moment – New test of General Relativity?
 Measurement of Gravitomagnetic and Acceleration Fields Around Rotating Superconductors M. Tajmar, et al., 17 October 2006.
 Test of the Lense–Thirring effect with the MGS Mars probe, New Scientist, January 2007.

General relativity
Effects of gravitation
Tests of general relativity